Empire Caicos was a  cargo ship which was built in 1945 for the Ministry of War Transport (MoWT). She was sold in 1946 and renamed Sugar Transporter. In 1957 she was sold and renamed Pattawilya. In 1962, she was sold and renamed Clovelly, serving until she was damaged in a storm in 1967 and then scrapped later that year.

Description
Empire Caicos was built by William Gray & Co. Ltd., West Hartlepool for the MoWT. She was launched on 28 February 1945 and completed in March.

She had a GRT of 3,533 and a NRT of 2,250. The engine was built by the Central Marine Engineering Works, West Hartlepool.

History
Empire Caicos was allocated the United Kingdom Official Number 180082. She used the Code Letters GFDY. She was owned by the MoWT and operated under the management of H Hogarth & Sons Ltd. In 1946, management was transferred to the Rodney Steamship Co Ltd.

In 1950, Empire Caicos was sold to Silvertown Services Ltd and renamed Sugar Transporter. She was placed under the management of R S Dalgleish Ltd, Newcastle upon Tyne. In 1957, Sugar Transporter was sold to J Paterson & Co (Pty) Ltd, Melbourne, Australia and renamed Pattawilya. She was used to carry cargos of coal, gypsum and limestone, as well as general cargo to the coastal ports of Australia.

In 1961 she was sold to McIlwraith, McEacharn & Co. In 1962, Pattawilya was sold to Cronulla Shipping Co Ltd, Hong Kong and renamed Clovelly. In 1963, she was sold to the San Jeronimo Steamship Co Ltd, Panama. On 6 January 1967, Clovelly was damaged in a storm and was towed in to Sasebo, Japan. She was then sold for scrap, arriving at Uchiumi on 13 May 1967.

References

External links
 Blog thread with photo of Sugar Transporter

1945 ships
Ships built on the River Tees
Empire ships
Ministry of War Transport ships
Merchant ships of the United Kingdom
Steamships of the United Kingdom
Merchant ships of Australia
Merchant ships of Hong Kong
Steamships of Hong Kong
Merchant ships of Panama
Steamships of Panama
Iron and steel steamships of Australia